The 2019–20 Liga IV Constanța was the 52nd season of the Liga IV Constanța, the fourth tier of the Romanian football league system. The season began on 17 August 2019 and was scheduled to end in June 2020, but was suspended in March because of the COVID-19 pandemic in Romania. 

AJF Constanța intended to end the season with a play-off between the first four ranked teams, but Viitorul Fântânele, Năvodari and Agigea announced that cannot comply with the conditions imposed by the medical protocol. Following this decisions, on 18 July 2020, the emergency committee of AJF Constanța declared Gloria Albești county champion and the representative of Constanța County at the promotion play-off to Liga III.

Overview

Team changes

To Liga IV Constanța
Relegated from Liga III
 —

Promoted from Liga V Constanța
 Peştera
 Viitorul Pecineaga

From Liga IV Constanța
Promoted to Liga III
 Poseidon Limanu-2 Mai

Relegated to Liga V Constanța
 —

Other changes
 Mihail Kogălniceanu and Voința Valu lui Traian was spared from relegation.

 FC Farul Constanța withdrew from Liga IV.

 Emaus Cernavodă took the place of Peştera.

Competition format
The league was played in a double round-robin format. The team ranked first will crowned county champion and qualify to promotion play-off in Liga III. The last three teams will relegated to Liga V Constanța County.

League table

Promotion play-off

Champions of Liga IV – Constanța County face champions of Liga IV – Buzău County and Liga IV – Tulcea County.

Region 7 (South–East)

Group B

See also

Main Leagues
 2019–20 Liga I
 2019–20 Liga II
 2019–20 Liga III
 2019–20 Liga IV

County Leagues (Liga IV series)

 2019–20 Liga IV Alba
 2019–20 Liga IV Arad
 2019–20 Liga IV Argeș
 2019–20 Liga IV Bacău
 2019–20 Liga IV Bihor
 2019–20 Liga IV Bistrița-Năsăud
 2019–20 Liga IV Botoșani
 2019–20 Liga IV Brăila
 2019–20 Liga IV Brașov
 2019–20 Liga IV Bucharest
 2019–20 Liga IV Buzău
 2019–20 Liga IV Călărași
 2019–20 Liga IV Caraș-Severin
 2019–20 Liga IV Cluj
 2019–20 Liga IV Covasna
 2019–20 Liga IV Dâmbovița
 2019–20 Liga IV Dolj
 2019–20 Liga IV Galați 
 2019–20 Liga IV Giurgiu
 2019–20 Liga IV Gorj
 2019–20 Liga IV Harghita
 2019–20 Liga IV Hunedoara
 2019–20 Liga IV Ialomița
 2019–20 Liga IV Iași
 2019–20 Liga IV Ilfov
 2019–20 Liga IV Maramureș
 2019–20 Liga IV Mehedinți
 2019–20 Liga IV Mureș
 2019–20 Liga IV Neamț
 2019–20 Liga IV Olt
 2019–20 Liga IV Prahova
 2019–20 Liga IV Sălaj
 2019–20 Liga IV Satu Mare
 2019–20 Liga IV Sibiu
 2019–20 Liga IV Suceava
 2019–20 Liga IV Teleorman
 2019–20 Liga IV Timiș
 2019–20 Liga IV Tulcea
 2019–20 Liga IV Vâlcea
 2019–20 Liga IV Vaslui
 2019–20 Liga IV Vrancea

References

External links
 Official website 

Liga IV seasons
Sport in Constanța County